Hanxi may refer to:

Hanxi Subdistrict, a subdistrict of Hanjiang District, Putian, Fujian, China
Han opera, a Chinese opera genre from Hubei, formerly known as Hanxi
Han River (Taiwan), a river in Taichung, Taiwan
Yilan Creole Japanese, a Japanese-based creole in Yilan, Taiwan, also known as Hanxi language

See also
Hanxi Changlong station, a Guangzhou Metro station in Guangzhou, Guangdong, China